"Video Killed the Radio Star" is a song written by Trevor Horn, Geoff Downes and Bruce Woolley in 1979. It was recorded concurrently by Bruce Woolley and the Camera Club (with Thomas Dolby on keyboards) for their album English Garden and by British new wave/synth-pop group the Buggles, which consisted of Horn and Downes (and initially Woolley).

The Buggles' version of the track was recorded and mixed in 1979, released as their debut single on 7 September 1979 by Island Records, and included on their first album The Age of Plastic. The backing track was recorded at Virgin's Town House in West London, and mixing and vocal recording was done at Sarm East Studios.

The song relates to concerns about, and mixed attitudes toward 20th-century inventions and machines for the media arts. Musically, the song performs like an extended jingle and the composition plays in the key of D-flat major in common time at a tempo of 132 beats per minute. The track has been positively received, with reviewers praising its unusual musical pop elements. Although the song includes several common pop characteristics and six basic chords are used in its structure, Downes and writer Timothy Warner described the piece as musically complicated, due to its use of suspended and minor ninth chords for enhancement that gave the song a "slightly different feel."

On release, the single topped sixteen international music charts, including those in the UK, Australia, and Japan. It also peaked in the top 10 in Canada, Germany, New Zealand and South Africa, but only reached number 40 in the US. The accompanying music video was written, directed, and edited by Russell Mulcahy. It was the first music video shown on MTV in the US, airing at 12:01a.m. on 1 August 1981, and the first video shown on MTV Classic in the UK on 1 March 2010. The song has received several critical accolades, such as being ranked number 40 on VH1's 100 Greatest One-Hit Wonders of the '80s. It has also been covered by many recording artists.

Background and lyrics
The Buggles, which formed in 1977, first consisted of Trevor Horn, Geoff Downes and Bruce Woolley. They recorded the first demo of "Video Killed the Radio Star" on a Revox A77 tape recorder, one afternoon in 1978, in Downes' apartment located above a monumental stonemason's in Wimbledon Park, London. The piece was built up from a chorus riff developed by Woolley. It is one of the three Buggles songs that Woolley assisted in writing, the two others being "Clean, Clean" and "On TV". A later, more detailed demo of the song, featuring Horn's then-girlfriend Tina Charles on vocals, was recorded at Camden's Soundsuite Studios, and engineered by studio owner Peter Rackham. This demo became the blueprint for the final record, and helped the group get signed to Island Records to record and release their debut album The Age of Plastic, as well as producing and writing for the label, after Downes' girlfriend, who worked for Island, managed to get it played to executives there. Woolley left during recording to form his own band, The Camera Club, which did their own version of "Video", as well as "Clean, Clean" for their album English Garden.

Horn has said that J. G. Ballard's short story "The Sound-Sweep", in which the title character—a mute boy vacuuming up stray music in a world without it—comes upon an opera singer hiding in a sewer, provided inspiration for "Video", and he felt "an era was about to pass." Horn claimed that Kraftwerk was another influence of the song: "It was like you could see the future when you heard Kraftwerk, something new is coming, something different. Different rhythm section, different mentality. So we had all of that, myself and Bruce, and we wrote this song probably six months before we recorded it." In a 2018 interview Horn stated: "I'd read JG Ballard and had this vision of the future where record companies would have computers in the basement and manufacture artists. I'd heard Kraftwerk's The Man-Machine and video was coming. You could feel things changing".

All the tracks of The Age of Plastic deal with positives and concerns of the impact of modern technology. The theme of "Video Killed the Radio Star" is thus nostalgia, with the lyrics referring to a period of technological change in the 1960s, the desire to remember the past and the disappointment that children of the current generation would not appreciate the past. The lyrics relate to concerns of the varied behaviours towards 20th-century technical inventions and machines used and changed in media arts such as photography, cinema, radio, television, audio recording and record production. According to Horn, the band initially struggled to come up with a line to follow the song's opening ("I heard you on the wireless back in '52"): he eventually came up with "Lying awake intent at tuning in on you", inspired by memories of listening to Radio Luxembourg at night as a child. Woolley worried about the song's name, given the existence of a band with the name Radio Stars and a song titled "Video King" by singer Snips.

Development and composition
The Buggles' version of "Video Killed the Radio Star" is a new wave and synth-pop song. It performs like an extended jingle, sharing its rhythm characteristics with disco. The piece plays in common time at a bright tempo of 132 beats per minute. It is in the key of D♭ major, and six basic chords are used in the song's chord progression. According to Geoff Downes, "It's actually a lot more complicated piece of music than people think, for instance part of the bridge is actually suspended chords and minor 9ths. A lot of people transcribed the song wrongly, they thought it was a straight F# chord. The song was written in D flat. The suspended gives it a slightly different feel." Writing in his book, Pop Music: Technology and Creativity: Trevor Horn and the Digital Revolution, Timothy Warner said that the "relatively quiet introduction" helping the listener detect a high amount of "tape hiss" generated through the use of analogue multi-track tape recorders, as well as the timbre of the synthesized instruments, give an indication of the technical process and time of producing the song.

Horn and Downes tried to interest labels in the song, but were turned down multiple times, including by Island Records. Downes' then girlfriend worked for Island and was able to get the song listened to again. The demo ended up being heard by Chris Blackwell, who chose to sign the band.

The song took more than three months of production. In 2018 Downes stated that the version that was released was rewritten from that recorded for the band's demo tape: the verses were extended and Downes contributed a new intro and middle eight, with the bulk of the original song having already been written by Horn and Woolley when he joined. The instrumental track was recorded at Virgin's Town House in West London in twelve hours, with mixing and recording of vocals held at Sarm East Studios. The entire song was mixed through a Trident TSM console. "Video" was the first track recorded for the group's debut LP The Age of Plastic, which cost a sum of £60,000 to produce, and the song was mixed by Gary Langan four or five times. According to Langan, "there was no total recall, so we just used to start again. We’d do a mix and three or four days later Trevor would go, 'It's not happening. We need to do this and we need to do that.' The sound of the bass drum was one of his main concerns, along with his vocal and the backing vocals. It was all about how dry and how loud they should be in the mix without the whole thing sounding ridiculous. As it turned out, that record still had the loudest bass drum ever for its time."

The song includes instrumentation of drums, bass guitar, electric guitar, synth strings, piano, glockenspiel, marimbas and other futuristic, twinkly sounds, and vocals. Downes used a Solina, Minimoog and Prophet-5 to create the overdubbed orchestral parts. Both the male and female voices differ to give a tonal and historical contrast. When Langan was interviewed in December 2011, he believed the male vocal was recorded through either a dynamic Shure SM57, SM58, Sennheiser MD 421, or STC 4038 ribbon microphone, and that four or five takes had to be done. The male voice echoes the song's theme in the tone of the music, initially limited in bandwidth to give a "telephone" effect typical of early broadcasts, and uses a Mid-Atlantic accent resembling that of British singers in the 1950s and '60s. The Vox AC30 amplifier was used to achieve the telephone effect, and Gary Langan says he was trying to make it "loud without cutting your head off", in others words make the voice sound soft. Gary Langan and Trevor Horn also tried using a bullhorn, but they found it too harsh. Langan later compressed and EQ'd the male vocals, and he said that doing the compression for old-style vocal parts was a "real skill". The female vocals are panned in the left and right audio channels, and sound more modern and have a New York accent.

The single version of "Video Killed the Radio Star" lasts for 3 minutes and 25 seconds. The album version plays for 4 minutes and 13 seconds, about 48 seconds longer than the single version, as it fades into a piano and synth coda, which ends with a brief sampling of the female vocals.

Commercial performance
"Video Killed the Radio Star" was a huge commercial success, reaching number one on 16 national charts. The song made its debut on the UK Singles Chart in the top 40 at number 24, on the issue dated 29 September 1979. The next week, the track entered into the chart's top ten at number six before topping the chart on the week of 20 October. It was the 444th UK number-one hit in the chart's entire archive. In 2022, the single was certified platinum by the British Phonographic Industry (BPI) for UK sales and streams of 600,000 units.

In Australia, "Video Killed the Radio Star" reached number one, and for 27 years it held the country's record for best-selling single. In late 1979, while the single was still in an eight-week run at Number one in the charts, the single was awarded a platinum disc by Festival Records, the record's distributing company, for sales of over 100,000 copies in Australia. The song also made a number-one peak in France and Spain, where it was certified gold and platinum, respectively, as well as Austria, Ireland, Sweden and Switzerland. In other parts of Europe and Oceania, "Video Killed the Radio Star" was a number-two hit in Germany and New Zealand, and also charted in Flanders on the Ultratop 50 and in the Netherlands, on the Nationale Hitparade Top 50 (now the Single Top 100) and Dutch Top 40.

"Video Killed the Radio Star" did not start charting in North America, however, until November 1979. In the United States, the song appeared on the Billboard Hot 100 and Cash Box Top 100, barely breaking into the top 40 on both charts. In a 2015 list from Billboard, it tied with Marvin Gaye's recording of "The End of Our Road" as the "Biggest Hot 100 Hit" at the peak of number 40. "Video Killed the Radio Star" debuted at number 86 on the Billboard Hot 100 on the week of 10 November 1979, while on the Cash Box Top 100 it debuted at number 83 that same week. It started also at number 83 on the Canadian RPM Top Single Chart. By January 1980, it entered the top 40 at number 31, and on 2 February made it into the top 20 at number 11. Two weeks later, the song earned its peak in the top 10 at number 6 and issue dated 16 February 1980.

Critical reception
The song became a Billboard Top Single Pick on 3 November 1979.  The publication found the chorus catchy and also highlighted the orchestral instruments supporting the backing singers. Although there had been a mixed review of the single from Smash Hits, who found the song to be "too tidy, like vymura" (wallpaper), they listed it in a review of The Age of Plastic as one of the best tracks of the album, along with "Living in the Plastic Age". Timothy Warner wrote that, although several common pop elements were still present in the song, it included stronger originality for its own purpose than most other pop hits released at the time. These unusual pop music characteristics include the timbres of the male and female vocal parts, and the use of suspended fourth and ninths chords for enhancement in its progression. He also felt it was unnecessary to dislike it as a "novelty song". AllMusic's Heather Phares said the track "can be looked on as a perfectly preserved new wave gem", "just as the song looks back on the radio songs of the '50s and '60s". She concluded her review by saying that it "still sounds as immediate as it did when it was released, however, and that may be the song's greatest irony".

However, many writers called Woolley's recording of "Video" much better than the Buggles' version. This included one critic who called both acts overall as of being very high quality, but felt that Woolley's version was more faithful to the source material than that of The Buggles, noting the filtered vocals and cute, female vocals of the latter rendition as giving it a novelty feel. However, he also wrote of liking both versions of "Clean, Clean" on the same level.

Music video

Production and concept

The music video for "Video Killed the Radio Star", written, directed and edited by Australian Russell Mulcahy, was produced on a budget of $50,000. It was filmed in only a day in South London, and was edited in a couple of days.

The video starts with a young girl sitting in front of a radio. A black-and-white shot of Trevor Horn singing into an early radio-era microphone is superimposed over the young girl by the radio. The radio blows up by the time of the first chorus, then in the second verse, she is seen transported into the future, where she meets Horn and a silver-jumpsuited woman in a clear plastic tube. Shots of Horn and Geoff Downes are shown during the remainder of the video.

There were about 30 takes required for shots of the actress in the tube. The tube falls over in the video, although Mulcahy claims it was not intended to be shown in the final edit. Hans Zimmer can be briefly seen wearing black playing a keyboard, and Debi Doss and Linda Jardim, who provided the female vocals for the song, are also seen.

Broadcasting and reception
The video was first released in 1979, when it originally aired on the BBC's Top of the Pops for promotion of the single, in lieu of doing live performances. Zimmer recalled in 2001 that the video drew criticism from some viewers who watched it before it aired on MTV, due to being "'too violent' because we blew up a television." The video is best known as marking the debut of MTV, when the US channel started broadcasting at 12:01 AM on 1 August 1981. On 27 February 2000, it became the one-millionth video to be aired on MTV. It also opened MTV Classic in the UK and Ireland. The video marked the closing of MTV Philippines before its shutdown on 15 February 2010 at 11:49 PM. MTV co-founder Bob Pittman said the video "made an aspirational statement. We didn't expect to be competitive with radio, but it was certainly a sea-change kind of video." In July 2013, multiple independent artists covered the song for the launch of the TV channel Pivot, which launched with the music video of the cover on 1 August at 6am.

Live performances and cover versions
A notable interpretation of the melody was released in 1979 by French singer Ringo, using French language lyrics by Étienne Roda-Gil supplying a new title  ("Who is this big black raven?") Ringo's version peaked at number 8 in France.

The Presidents of the United States of America recorded a cover of the song which appeared on the soundtrack of the 1998 film The Wedding Singer starring Adam Sandler.

A rare live performance of the song by Horn and Downes came at a ZTT showcase in 1998.

In November 2006, the Producers played at their first gig in Camden Town. A video clip can be seen on ZTT Records of Horn singing lead vocals and playing bass in a performance of "Video Killed the Radio Star". Tina Charles appears on a YouTube video singing "Slave to the Rhythm" with the Producers and Horn reveals that Tina was the singer and originator of the "Oh Ah-Oh Ah-Oh" part of "Video"; fellow 5000 Volt member Martin Jay was also a session musician on The Buggles record.

Robbie Williams performed the song with Trevor Horn at the BBC Electric Proms on 20 October 2009.

Erasure covered this song as a final track to their Other People's Songs album. Vince Clarke in an interview said that he considers it "the perfect pop song" 

Anne Dudley, composer and co-founding member of The Art of Noise with Trevor Horn, performed the song on solo piano on her album Anne Dudley Plays the Art of Noise.

In popular culture
In mid-2020, the song became popular among TikTok users as a trend to revisit celebrity death conspiracies, and across the internet when a deepfake of Adolf Hitler and Joseph Stalin singing the song went viral on multiple social media sites.

Personnel
Sources:

Bruce Woolley version
Bruce Woolley – songwriter, guitar, vocals
Paul Robinson – drums
Debi Doss – backing vocals
Linda Jardim – backing vocals
Dave Birch – lead guitar
Gary Langan – mixing, recording
Hugh Padgham – recording, audio engineering
John Dent – mastering

The Buggles version
Geoff Downes – songwriter, producer, keyboards, percussion
Trevor Horn – songwriter, production, bass guitar, vocals
Bruce Woolley – songwriter

Charts

Weekly charts

Year-end charts

Sales and certifications

Accolades

See also
Reality Killed the Video Star, a 2009 album by Robbie Williams produced by Trevor Horn
"Internet Killed the Video Star", a 2010 song by the Limousines
"Check It Out", a 2010 song by will.i.am and Nicki Minaj which heavily samples the song.

No. 1 chart lists
List of number-one singles in Australia during the 1970s
List of European number-one hits of 1980
List of number-one singles of 1979 (France)
List of number-one singles of 1979 (Ireland)
List of number-one hits of 1980 (Italy)
List of number-one singles of 1980 (Spain)
List of number-one singles and albums in Sweden
List of number-one singles from 1968 to 1979 (Switzerland)
List of UK Singles Chart number ones of the 1970s
List of 1970s one-hit wonders in the United States

References

Bibliography

1979 songs
1979 debut singles
The Buggles songs
Epic Records singles
European Hot 100 Singles number-one singles
Irish Singles Chart number-one singles
Island Records singles
MTV
Music videos directed by Russell Mulcahy
Number-one singles in Australia
Number-one singles in Austria
Number-one singles in France
Number-one singles in Italy
Number-one singles in Spain
Number-one singles in Sweden
Number-one singles in Switzerland
Oricon International Singles Chart number-one singles
Song recordings produced by Trevor Horn
Songs about radio
Songs about television
Songs about nostalgia
Songs written by Bruce Woolley
Songs written by Geoff Downes
Songs written by Trevor Horn
UK Singles Chart number-one singles